Patricia Harty, also known professionally as Trisha Hart, is an American actress.

Early years 
Born in Washington, D.C., Harty lived in Baltimore until age 5, when she and her family moved. She took lessons in singing and dancing while growing up in North Miami, Florida, and graduated from Edison Senior High School in 1957. She worked for a lawyer, took secretarial classes, and majored in English at Columbia University.

Career
Harty performed in the national company of I Ought to Be in Pictures. On Broadway, Harty's credits include Fiorello! (1959) and Sail Away (1961).

Harty debuted on television as a dancer on Pat Boone's ABC Chevy Show program, and Perry Como's NBC Kraft Music Hall. She was also a featured dancer on Garry Moore's CBS series, where she also performed in comedy skits with Carol Burnett. Harty is known for her starring roles in several short-lived television series, Occasional Wife (1966–67) as Greta Patterson, Blondie (1968) as the titular Blondie Bumstead, The Bob Crane Show (1975) as Ellie Wilcox, and Herbie, the Love Bug (1982) as Susan MacLane. She also appeared on Broadway in Fiorello! and Sail Away.

Personal life
In the mid-1960s, Harty was married to E. Thomas Kearney, who was also her manager. She married Occasional Wife co-star Michael Callan. The marriage ended in divorce. She married Les Sheldon, who had been associate producer on The Bob Crane Show, in 1975.

References

External links

 
 

Living people
American television actresses
American musical theatre actresses
Actresses from Washington, D.C.
20th-century American actresses
21st-century American actresses
Year of birth missing (living people)